The following is a list of equipment of the Polish Land Forces.

Personnel equipment

Infantry weapons

Portable anti-material weapons

Military vehicles

Aircraft

Unmanned aerial vehicles

Planned equipment

References

Polish Land Forces
Polish Army
Equipment